The Moro III Cabinet was the 21st cabinet of the Italian Republic, that held office from 23 February 1966 to 24 June 1968, a total of 852 days, or 2 years, 4 months and 1 day. The cabinet is described as an organic centre-left government.

Party breakdown
 Christian Democracy (DC): prime minister, 14 ministers, 27 undersecretaries
 Italian Socialist Party (PSI): deputy prime minister, 5 ministers, 13 undersecretaries
 Italian Democratic Socialist Party (PSDI): 2 ministers, 5 undersecretaries
 Italian Republican Party (PRI): 1 minister, 1 undersecretary

Composition

References

Aldo Moro
Italian governments
1966 establishments in Italy
1968 disestablishments in Italy
Cabinets established in 1966
Cabinets disestablished in 1968